Bernard Herrmann (born Maximillian Herman; June 29, 1911December 24, 1975) was an American composer and conductor best known for his work in composing for films. As a conductor, he championed the music of lesser-known composers. He is widely regarded as one of the greatest film composers. Alex Ross writes that "Over four decades, he revolutionized movie scoring by abandoning the illustrative musical techniques that dominated Hollywood in the 1930's and imposing his own peculiar harmonic and rhythmic vocabulary."

An Academy Award-winner (for The Devil and Daniel Webster, 1941; ( first released as "All That Money Can Buy"), Herrmann is known for his collaborations with Alfred Hitchcock, notably The Man Who Knew Too Much (where he makes a cameo as the conductor at Royal Albert Hall), Vertigo, North by Northwest, Psycho, The Birds (as "sound consultant") and Marnie. He worked in radio drama, composing for Orson Welles's The Mercury Theater on the Air, and his first film score was for Welles's film debut, Citizen Kane. His other credits include Jane Eyre, Anna and the King of Siam, The Ghost and Mrs. Muir, The Day the Earth Stood Still, Cape Fear, Fahrenheit 451 and Twisted Nerve. Herrmann scored films that were inspired by Hitchcock, like François Truffaut's The Bride Wore Black and Brian De Palma's Sisters and Obsession. He composed the scores for several fantasy films by Ray Harryhausen, and composed for television, including Have Gun – Will Travel and Rod Serling's The Twilight Zone. His last score, recorded shortly before his death, was for Martin Scorsese's Taxi Driver.

Early life and career
Herrmann, the son of a Jewish middle-class family of Russian origin, was born in New York City as Maximillian Herman. He was the son of Ida (Gorenstein) and Abram Dardik, who was from Ukraine and had changed the family name. Herrmann attended high school at DeWitt Clinton High School, an all-boys public school at that time on 10th Avenue and 59th Street in New York City. His father encouraged music activity, taking him to the opera, and encouraging him to learn the violin. After winning a composition prize at the age of thirteen, he decided to concentrate on music, and went to New York University, where he studied with Percy Grainger and Philip James. He also studied at the Juilliard School, and at the age of 20, formed his own orchestra, the New Chamber Orchestra of New York.

In 1934, he joined the Columbia Broadcasting System (CBS) as a staff conductor. Within two years, he was appointed music director of the Columbia Workshop, an experimental radio drama series for which Herrmann composed or arranged music (one notable program was The Fall of the City). Within nine years, he had become chief conductor to the CBS Symphony Orchestra. He was responsible for introducing more new works to US audiences than any other conductor – he was a particular champion of Charles Ives' music, which was virtually unknown at that time. Herrmann's radio programs of concert music, which were broadcast under such titles as Invitation to Music and Exploring Music, were planned in an unconventional way and featured rarely heard music, old and new, which was not heard in public concert halls. Examples include broadcasts devoted to music of famous amateurs or of notable royal personages, such as the music of Frederick the Great of Prussia, Henry VIII, Charles I, Louis XIII and so on.

Herrmann's many US broadcast premieres during the 1940s included Myaskovsky's 22nd Symphony, Gian Francesco Malipiero's 3rd Symphony, Richard Arnell's 1st Symphony, Edmund Rubbra's 3rd Symphony and Ives' 3rd Symphony. He performed the works of Hermann Goetz, Alexander Gretchaninov, Niels Gade and Franz Liszt, and received many outstanding American musical awards and grants for his unusual programming and championship of little-known composers. In Dictators of the Baton, David Ewen wrote that Herrmann was "one of the most invigorating influences in the radio music of the past decade." Also during the 1940s, Herrmann's own concert music was taken up and played by such celebrated maestri as Leopold Stokowski, Sir John Barbirolli, Sir Thomas Beecham and Eugene Ormandy.

Between two films made by Orson Welles (see below), he wrote the score for William Dieterle's The Devil and Daniel Webster (1941), for which he won his only Academy Award. In 1947, Herrmann scored the atmospheric music for The Ghost and Mrs. Muir. In 1951, his score for The Day the Earth Stood Still featured the theremin.

In 1934, Herrmann met a young CBS secretary and aspiring writer Lucille Fletcher. Fletcher was impressed with Herrmann's work, and the two began a five-year courtship. Marriage was delayed by the objections of Fletcher's parents, who disliked the fact that Herrmann was a Jew and were put off by what they viewed as his abrasive personality. The couple finally married on October 2, 1939. They had two daughters: Dorothy (born 1941) and Wendy (born 1945).

Fletcher was to become a noted radio scriptwriter, and she and Herrmann collaborated on several projects throughout their career. He contributed the score to the famed 1941 radio presentation of Fletcher's original story The Hitch-Hiker on The Orson Welles Show, and Fletcher helped to write the libretto for his operatic adaptation of Wuthering Heights. The couple divorced in 1948. The next year, he married Lucille's cousin Lucy (Kathy Lucille) Anderson. That marriage lasted until 1964.

Collaboration with Orson Welles

While at CBS, Herrmann met Orson Welles, and wrote or arranged scores for radio shows in which Welles appeared or wrote, such as the Columbia Workshop, Welles's Mercury Theatre on the Air and Campbell Playhouse series (1938–1940), which were radio adaptations of literature and film. He conducted the live performances, including Welles's famous adaptation of H.G. Wells's The War of the Worlds broadcast on October 30, 1938, which consisted entirely of pre-existing music. Herrmann used large sections of his score for the inaugural broadcast of The Campbell Playhouse, an adaptation of Rebecca, for the feature film Jane Eyre (1943), the third film in which Welles starred.

When Welles gained his RKO Pictures contract, Herrmann worked for him. He wrote his first film score for Citizen Kane (1941) and received an Academy Award nomination for Best Score of a Dramatic Picture. The aria from the fictional opera Salammbo, which Kane's wife Susan Alexander (Dorothy Comingore) performs, was also composed by Herrmann. Welles wanted Herrmann to do a pastiche of real operas, writing in a telegram "Here is a chance for you to do something witty and amusing." Herrmann composed the score for Welles's The Magnificent Ambersons (1942); like the film, the music was heavily edited by RKO Pictures. When more than half of his score was removed from the soundtrack, Herrmann bitterly severed his ties with the film and promised legal action if his name were not removed from the credits.

Herrmann was music director for Welles's CBS radio series The Orson Welles Show (1941–1942), which included the debut of his wife Lucille Fletcher's suspense classic The Hitch-Hiker; Ceiling Unlimited (1942), a program conceived to glorify the aviation industry and dramatize its role in World War II; and The Mercury Summer Theatre on the Air (1946). "Benny Herrmann was an intimate member of the family," Welles told filmmaker Peter Bogdanovich.

Herrmann was among those who rebutted the charges Pauline Kael made in her 1971 essay "Raising Kane", in which she revived controversy over the authorship of the screenplay for Citizen Kane and denigrated Welles's contributions.

Collaboration with Alfred Hitchcock

Herrmann is closely associated with the director Alfred Hitchcock. He wrote the scores for seven Hitchcock films, from The Trouble with Harry (1955) to Marnie (1964), a period that included Vertigo, North by Northwest, and Psycho. He was also credited as sound consultant on The Birds (1963), as there was no actual music in the film as such, only electronically made bird sounds.

The film score for the remake of The Man Who Knew Too Much (1956) was composed by Herrmann, but two of the more significant pieces of music in the film – the song "Que Sera, Sera (Whatever Will Be, Will Be)" and the Storm Clouds Cantata played in the Royal Albert Hall – are not by Herrmann (although he did re-orchestrate the cantata by Australian-born composer Arthur Benjamin written for the earlier Hitchcock film of the same name). However, this film did give Herrmann the opportunity for an on-screen appearance: he is the conductor of the London Symphony Orchestra in the Albert Hall scene. Herrmann's score for Hitchcock's The Wrong Man (1956) is in a jazz style and makes heavy use of bass; Emmanuel Balestrero (Henry Fonda), the wrong man of the title, is a jazz bassist.

Herrmann's most recognizable music is from Hitchcock's Psycho. Unusual for a thriller at the time, the score uses only the string section of the orchestra. The screeching violin heard during the famous shower scene (which Hitchcock originally suggested have no music at all) is one of the most famous moments in film score history. Hitchcock admitted at the time that Psycho heavily depended on the music for its tension and sense of pervading doom. David Thomson notes Herrmann's "sly borrowings from Beethoven's Eroica", a recording of which can be seen in the bedroom of Norman Bates (Anthony Perkins). Herrmann's score also had a direct influence on producer George Martin's staccato string arrangement for the Beatles' 1966 single "Eleanor Rigby".

His score for Vertigo (1958) is seen as just as masterly. In many of the key scenes, Hitchcock let Herrmann's score take centre stage, a score whose melodies, echoing the "Liebestod" from Richard Wagner's Tristan und Isolde, dramatically convey the main character's obsessive love for the image of a woman and underscores that Vertigo, like Tristan, is a story of love and death. Ross writes that Hermann's homage "is a matter of deliberation and subtlety. The main melodic contour is his own; the harmony is still his idiosyncratic construction. He is jogging the memory of those who know Tristan and the subconscious of those who don't. His veiled citations indicate in their own way the unstoppable recurrence of the past."

A notable feature of the Vertigo score is the ominous two-note falling motif that opens the suite – it is a direct musical imitation of the two notes sounded by the fog horns located at either side of the Golden Gate Bridge in San Francisco (as heard from the San Francisco side of the bridge). This motif has direct relevance to the film because the horns can be clearly heard sounding in just this manner at Fort Point, the spot where a key incident occurs involving the character played by Kim Novak.

However, according to Dan Auiler, author of Vertigo: The Making of a Hitchcock Classic, Herrmann deeply regretted being unable to conduct his composition for Vertigo. A musicians' strike in America meant that it was actually conducted in England by Muir Mathieson. Herrmann always personally conducted his own works and given that he considered the composition among his best works, he regarded it as a missed opportunity.

In a question-and-answer session at George Eastman House in October 1973, Herrmann stated that, unlike most film composers who did not have any creative input into the style and tone of the score, he insisted on creative control as a condition of accepting a scoring assignment:

Herrmann stated that Hitchcock would invite him on to the production of a film and, depending on his decision about the length of the music, either expand or contract the scene. It was Hitchcock who asked Herrmann for the "recognition scene" near the end of Vertigo (the scene in which James Stewart's character suddenly realizes Kim Novak's identity) to be played with music.

In 1963, Herrmann began writing original music for the CBS-TV anthology series The Alfred Hitchcock Hour, which was in its eighth season. Hitchcock served only as advisor on the show, which he hosted, but Herrmann was again working with former Mercury Theatre actor Norman Lloyd, co-producer (with Joan Harrison) of the series. Herrmann scored 17 episodes (1963–1965), and like much of his work for CBS, the music frequently was reused for other programs.

Herrmann's relationship with Hitchcock came to an abrupt end when they disagreed over the score for Torn Curtain. Reportedly pressured by Universal executives, Hitchcock wanted a score that was more jazz- and pop-influenced. Hitchcock's biographer Patrick McGilligan stated that Hitchcock was worried about becoming old-fashioned and felt that Herrmann's music had to change with the times as well. Herrmann initially accepted the offer, but then decided to score the film according to his own ideas. François Truffaut writes that "in 1966, In Hollywood and elsewhere, it was the practice of the film industry to favor scores that would sell as popular records—the kind o film music that could be danced to in discotheques. In this sort of game, Hermann, a disciple of Wagner and Stravinsky, was bound to be a loser." Truffaut writes that "Hermmann's removal is a flagrant injustice, since it is a matter of record that his contributions to The Man Who Knew Too Much, North by Northwest, and Psycho had greatly enhanced the success of these films."

Hitchcock listened to only the prelude of the score, then confronted Herrmann about the pop score. Herrmann, equally incensed, bellowed "Look, Hitch, you can't outjump your own shadow. And you don't make pop pictures. What do you want with me? I don't write pop music." Hitchcock unrelentingly insisted that Herrmann change the score, violating Herrmann's general claim to the creative control he had always maintained in their previous works together. Herrmann then said "Hitch, what's the use of my doing more with you? I had a career before you, and I will afterwards." The score was rejected and replaced with one by John Addison.

According to McGilligan, Herrmann later tried to reconcile with Hitchcock, but Hitchcock refused to see him. Herrmann's widow Norma Herrmann disputed this in a conversation with Günther Kögebehn for the Bernard Herrmann Society in 2004:

In 2009, Norma Herrmann began to auction her husband's personal collection on Bonhams.com, adding more interesting details to the two men's relationship. While Herrmann had brought Hitchcock a copy of his classical work after the break-up, Hitchcock had given Herrmann a copy of his 1967 interview book with François Truffaut, which he inscribed "To Benny with my fondest wishes, Hitch."

"This is rather interesting because it comes a year after Hitchcock had abruptly fired Herrmann from his work scoring Torn Curtain and indicates Hitchcock may have hoped to mend fences with Herrmann and have him score his next film, Topaz," reported Wellesnet, the Orson Welles website, in April 2009:

Herrmann's unused score for Torn Curtain was commercially recorded after his death, initially by Elmer Bernstein for his Film Music Collection subscription record label (reissued by Warner Bros. Records), then in a fuller realization of the original score by Joel McNeely and the Royal Scottish National Orchestra and later, in a concert suite adapted by Christopher Palmer, by Esa-Pekka Salonen and the Los Angeles Philharmonic for Sony. Some of Herrmann's cues for Torn Curtain were post-synched to the final cut, where they showed how remarkably attuned the composer was to the action, and how, arguably, more effective his score could have been.

Later life and death
From the late 1950s to the mid-1960s, Herrmann scored a series of notable mythically themed fantasy films, including Journey to the Center of the Earth and the Ray Harryhausen Dynamation epics The 7th Voyage of Sinbad, Jason and the Argonauts, Mysterious Island and The 3 Worlds of Gulliver. His score for The 7th Voyage was highly acclaimed by admirers of that genre of film and was praised by Harryhausen as Herrmann's best score of the four.

During the same period, Herrmann turned his talents to writing scores for television shows. He wrote the scores for several well-known episodes of the original Twilight Zone series, including the lesser known theme used during the series' first season, as well as the opening theme to Have Gun – Will Travel.

In the mid-1960s, he composed the highly regarded music score for François Truffaut's Fahrenheit 451. Scored for strings, two harps, vibraphone, xylophone and glockenspiel, Herrmann's score created a driving, neurotic mood that perfectly suited the film.

By 1967, Herrmann worked almost exclusively in England. In November 1967, the 56-year-old composer married 27-year-old journalist Norma Shepherd, his third wife. In August 1971, the Herrmanns made London their permanent home.

Herrmann's last film scores included Sisters and Obsession for Brian De Palma. His final film soundtrack, and the last work he completed, was his sombre score for Taxi Driver (1976), directed by Martin Scorsese. It was De Palma who had suggested to Scorsese to use the composer. Immediately after finishing the recording of the Taxi Driver soundtrack on December 23, 1975, Herrmann viewed the rough cut of what was to be his next film assignment, Larry Cohen's God Told Me To, and dined with Cohen. He returned to his hotel, and died from an apparent heart attack in his sleep the next day. Scorsese and Cohen both dedicated their respective films in his memory. Herrmann was interred in Beth David Cemetery at Elmont, New York.

Other works
As well as his many film scores, Herrmann wrote several concert pieces, including his Symphony in 1941; the opera Wuthering Heights; the cantata Moby Dick (1938), dedicated to Charles Ives; and For the Fallen, a tribute to the soldiers who died in battle in World War II. He recorded all these compositions, and several others, for the Unicorn label during his last years in London. A work written late in his life, Souvenir de Voyages, showed his ability to write non-programmatic pieces.

Compositional style and philosophy
Herrmann's music is typified by frequent use of ostinati (short repeating patterns), novel orchestration, and in his film scores, an ability to portray character traits not altogether obvious from other elements of the film.

Early in his life, Herrmann committed himself to a creed of personal integrity at the price of unpopularity: the quintessential artist. His philosophy is summarized by a favorite Tolstoy quote: 'Eagles fly alone and sparrows fly in flocks.' Thus, Herrmann only composed music for films when he was allowed the artistic liberty to compose what he wished without the director getting in the way. This was the cause of the split with Hitchcock after over a decade of composing scores for the director's films.

His philosophy of orchestrating film was based on the assumption that the musicians were selected and hired for the recording session – that this music was not constrained to the musical forces of the concert hall. For example, his use of nine harps in Beneath the 12-Mile Reef created an extraordinary underwater-like sonic landscape; his use of four alto flutes in Citizen Kane contributed to the unsettling quality of the opening, only matched by the use of 12 flutes in his unused Torn Curtain score; and his use of the serpent in White Witch Doctor is possibly the first use of that instrument in a film score.

Herrmann said: "To orchestrate is like a thumbprint. I can't understand having someone else do it. It would be like someone putting color to your paintings."

Herrmann subscribed to the belief that the best film music should be able to stand on its own legs when detached from the film for which it was originally written. To this end, he made several well-known recordings for Decca of arrangements of his own film music as well as music of other prominent composers.

Use of electronic instruments
Herrmann's involvement with electronic musical instruments dates back to 1951, when he used the theremin in The Day the Earth Stood Still. Robert B. Sexton has noted  that this score involved the use of treble and bass theremins (played by Dr. Samuel Hoffmann and Paul Shure), electric strings, bass, prepared piano, and guitar together with various pianos and harps, electronic organs, brass, and percussion, and that Herrmann treated the theremins as a truly orchestral section.

Herrmann was a sound consultant on The Birds, which made extensive use of an electronic instrument called the mixturtrautonium, performed by Oskar Sala on the film's soundtrack. Herrmann used several electronic instruments on his score of It's Alive, as well as the Moog synthesizer for the main themes in Endless Night and Sisters.

Legacy and recording
Herrmann is still a prominent figure in the world of film music today, despite his death in 1975. As such, his career has been studied extensively by biographers and documentarians. His string-only score for Psycho, for example, set the standard when it became a new way to write music for thrillers (rather than big fully orchestrated pieces). In 1992, the documentary Music for the Movies: Bernard Herrmann was made about him. It was nominated for the Academy Award for Best Documentary Feature. Also in 1992, a -hour-long National Public Radio documentary was produced on his life – Bernard Herrmann: A Celebration of His Life and Music. In 1991, Steven C. Smith wrote a Herrmann biography titled A Heart at Fire's Center, a quote from a favorite Stephen Spender poem of Herrmann.

His music continues to be used in films and recordings after his death. On the 1977 album Ra, American progressive rock group Utopia adapted Herrmann's "Mountain Top/Sunrise" from Journey to the Center of the Earth in a rock arrangement, as the introduction to the album's opening song, "Communion With The Sun". The 1990s saw two iconic Herrmann scores adapted for remakes: celebrated composer Elmer Bernstein adapted and expanded Herrmann's music for Martin Scorsese's update of Cape Fear, expanding the score to include music from Herrmann's rejected score to Torn Curtain, and similarly, though more faithful to the original material, film composer Danny Elfman and orchestrator Steve Bartek adapted Herrmann's full Psycho score for director Gus Van Sant's shot-for-shot remake. "Georgie's Theme" from Herrmann's score for the 1968 film Twisted Nerve is whistled by assassin Elle Driver in the hospital corridor scene in Quentin Tarantino's Kill Bill: Volume 1 (2003). 2011 saw several uses of Herrmann's music from Vertigo: the opening theme was used in the prologue to Lady Gaga's video for "Born This Way" and during a flashback sequence in the pilot episode of FX's American Horror Story (which featured "Georgie's Theme" in later episodes as a recurring musical motif for the character of Tate), and Ludovic Bource used the love theme in the last reels of The Artist. Vertigo opening sequence was also copied for the opening sequence of the 1993 miniseries, Tales Of The City, an adaptation of the first in a series of books by Armistead Maupin. More recently, the first and fourth episodes of Amazon Prime's 2018 streaming series Homecoming used cues from Herrmann's Vertigo and The Day the Earth Stood Still respectively.

Herrmann's film music is well represented on disc. His friend, John Steven Lasher, has produced several albums featuring Urtext recordings, including Battle of Neretva, Citizen Kane, The Kentuckian, The Magnificent Ambersons, The Night Digger and Sisters, under various labels owned by Fifth Continent Australia Pty Ltd.

Herrmann was an early and enthusiastic proponent of the music of Charles Ives. He met Ives in the early 1930s, performed many of his works while conductor of the CBS Symphony Orchestra, and conducted Ives' Second Symphony with the London Symphony Orchestra on his first visit to London in 1956. Herrmann later made a recording of the work in 1972 and this reunion with the LSO, after more than a decade, was significant to him for several reasons – he had long hoped to record his own interpretation of the symphony, feeling that Leonard Bernstein's 1951 version was "overblown and inaccurate"; on a personal level, it also served to assuage Herrmann's long-held feeling that he had been snubbed by the orchestra after his first visit in 1956. The notoriously prickly composer had also been enraged by the recent appointment of the LSO's new chief conductor André Previn, who Herrmann detested, and deprecatingly referred to as "that jazz boy".

Herrmann was also an ardent champion of the romantic-era composer Joachim Raff, whose music had fallen into near-oblivion by the 1960s. During the 1940s, Herrmann had played Raff's 3rd and 5th Symphonies in his CBS radio broadcasts. In May 1970, Herrmann conducted the world premiere recording of Raff's Fifth Symphony Lenore for the Unicorn label, which he mainly financed himself. The recording did not attract much notice in its time, despite receiving excellent reviews, but is now considered a major turning-point in the rehabilitation of Raff as a composer.

In 1996, Sony Classical released The Film Scores, a recording of Herrmann's music performed by the Los Angeles Philharmonic under the baton of Esa-Pekka Salonen. This disc received the 1998 Cannes Classical Music Award for Best 20th-Century Orchestral Recording. It was also nominated for the 1998 Grammy Award for Best Engineered Album, Classical.

Decca reissued on CD a series of Phase 4 Stereo recordings with Herrmann conducting the London Philharmonic Orchestra, mostly in excerpts from his various film scores, including one devoted to music from several of the Hitchcock films (including Psycho, Marnie and Vertigo). In the liner notes of the Hitchcock Phase 4 album, Herrmann said that the suite from The Trouble with Harry was a "portrait of Hitch". Another album was devoted to his fantasy film scores – a few of them being the films of the special effects animator Ray Harryhausen, including music from The Seventh Voyage of Sinbad and The Three Worlds of Gulliver. His other Phase 4 Stereo LPs of the 1970s included Music from the Great Film Classics (suites and excerpts from Jane Eyre, The Snows of Kilimanjaro, Citizen Kane and The Devil and Daniel Webster); and "The Fantasy World of Bernard Herrmann" (Journey to the Center of the Earth, The Day the Earth Stood Still, and Fahrenheit 451.)

Charles Gerhardt conducted a 1974 RCA recording titled The Classic Film Scores of Bernard Herrmann with the National Philharmonic Orchestra. It featured suites from Citizen Kane (with Kiri Te Kanawa singing Salammbo's Aria) and White Witch Doctor, along with music from On Dangerous Ground, Beneath the 12-Mile Reef, and the Hangover Square piano concerto.

During his last years in England, between 1966 and 1975, Herrmann made several LPs of other composers' music for assorted record labels. These included Phase 4 Stereo recordings of Gustav Holst's The Planets and Charles Ives's 2nd Symphony, as well as an album titled "The Impressionists" (music by Satie, Debussy, Ravel, Fauré and Honegger) and another titled "The Four Faces of Jazz" (works by Weill, Gershwin, Stravinsky and Milhaud). As well as recording his own film music in Phase 4 Stereo, he made LPs of movie scores by others, such as Great Shakespearean Films (music by Shostakovich for Hamlet, Walton for Richard III and Rózsa for Julius Caesar), and Great British Film Music (movie scores by Lambert, Bax, Benjamin, Walton, Vaughan Williams, and Bliss).

For Unicorn Records, he recorded several of his own concert-hall works, including the cantata Moby Dick, his opera Wuthering Heights, his symphony, and the suites Welles Raises Kane and The Devil and Daniel Webster.

Pristine Audio released two CDs of Herrmann's radio broadcasts. One is devoted to a CBS program from 1945 that features music by Handel, Vaughan Williams and Elgar; the other features works by Charles Ives, Robert Russell Bennett and Herrmann.

Influences and legacy
The works of Herrmann are widely studied, imitated and performed to this very day. His work has left a profound influence on composers of film music that followed him, the most notable being John Williams, Elmer Bernstein, Jerry Goldsmith, Howard Shore, Lalo Schifrin, James Horner, Carter Burwell and others. Stephen Sondheim found Herrmann to be a primary influence after seeing the film Hangover Square.

Popular film composer Danny Elfman counts Herrmann as his biggest influence, and has said hearing Herrmann's score to The Day the Earth Stood Still when he was a child was the first time he realized the powerful contribution a composer makes to the movies. Pastiche of Herrmann's music can be heard in Elfman's score for Pee-Wee's Big Adventure, specifically in the cues "Stolen Bike" and "Clown Dream", which reference Herrmann's "The Murder" from Psycho and "The Duel With the Skeleton" from 7th Voyage of Sinbad respectively. The prelude for Elfman's main Batman theme references Herrmann's "Mountain Top / Sunrise" from Journey to the Center of the Earth, and the Joker character's "fate motif" heard throughout the score is inspired by Herrmann's Vertigo. More integral homage can be heard in Elfman's later scores for Mars Attacks! and Hitchcock, the latter based on Hitchcock's creation of Psycho, as well as the "Blue Strings" movement of Elfman's first concert work Serenada Schizophrana.

In addition to Elfman, fellow film composers Richard Band, Graeme Revell, Christopher Young, Alexandre Desplat and Brian Tyler consider Herrmann to be a major inspiration. In 1985, Richard Band's opening theme to Re-Animator borrows heavily from Herrmann's opening score to Psycho. In 1990, Graeme Revell had adapted Herrmann's music from Psycho for its television sequel-prequel Psycho IV: The Beginning. Revell's early orchestral music during the early nineties, such as Child's Play 2 (which its music score being reminiscent of Herrmann's scores to the 1973 film Sisters, due to the synthesizers incorporated in the chilling parts of the orchestral score) as well as the 1963 The Twilight Zone episode "Living Doll" (which inspired the Child's Play franchise), were very similar to Herrmann's work. Also, Revell's score for the video game Call of Duty 2 was reminiscent of Herrmann's rare WWII music scores such as The Naked and the Dead and Battle of Neretva. Young, who was a jazz drummer at first, listened to Herrmann's works which convinced him to be a film composer. Tyler's score for Bill Paxton's film Frailty was influenced by Herrmann's film music.

Sir George Martin, best known for producing and often adding orchestration to the Beatles music, cites Herrmann as an influence in his own work, particularly in Martin's scoring of the Beatles' song "Eleanor Rigby". Martin later expanded on this as an extended suite for McCartney's 1984 film Give My Regards to Broad Street, which features a very recognizable homage to Herrmann's score for Psycho.

Avant-garde composer/saxophonist/producer John Zorn, in the biographical film A Bookshelf on Top of the Sky, cited Bernard Herrmann as one of his favorite composers and a major influence.

In addition to adapting and expanding the original score from Cape Fear for the Martin Scorsese remake, Elmer Bernstein recorded Herrmann's score for The Ghost and Mrs. Muir, released in 1975 on the Varèse Sarabande label and later reissued on CD in the 1990s.

David Thomson calls him the greatest film composer, writing: "Herrmann knew how lovely the dark should be, and he was at his best in rites of dismay, dark dreams, introspection, and the gloomy romance of loneliness. No one else would have dared or known to make the score for Taxi Driver such a lament for impossible love... Yet the score for Taxi Driver is universally cinematic: it speaks to sitting in the dark, full of dread and desire, watching."

Accolades

Academy Awards
These awards and nominations are recorded by the Motion Picture Academy of Arts and Sciences:
 1941: Winner, Music Score of a Dramatic Picture, The Devil and Daniel Webster (later renamed All That Money Can Buy)
 1941: Nominee, Music Score of a Dramatic Motion Picture, Citizen Kane
 1946: Nominee, Music Score of a Dramatic Picture, Anna and the King of Siam
 1976: Nominee, Original Score, Obsession
 1976: Nominee, Original Score, Taxi Driver

American Film Institute
In 2005 the American Film Institute respectively ranked Herrmann's scores for Psycho and Vertigo #4 and #12 on its list of the 25 greatest film scores. His scores for the following films were also nominated for the list:
 Citizen Kane (1941)
 The Devil and Daniel Webster (1941)
 Jane Eyre (1944)
 The Ghost and Mrs. Muir (1947)
 The Day the Earth Stood Still (1951)
 North by Northwest (1959)
 Taxi Driver (1976)

British Academy Film Awards
 1976: Winner, British Academy Film Award, Best Film Music, Taxi Driver

In popular culture
 Featured (music and as a character) in"The Lovesong of Alfred J. Hitchcock" by David Rudkin (BBC Radio, 1993) 
 Theme from "Marnie" adapted as a song for the movie Marnie, this is a studio recording cover by vocalist Michael Poss on the 2000 album release Silver Screen Serenades
 Part of Herrmann's score for The Trouble with Harry was used in a 2010 U.S. television commercial for the Volkswagen CC.
 Music from the Vertigo soundtrack was used in BBC Four's Spitfire Women documentary, aired in the UK in September 2010.
 A 2011 TV commercial titled "Snowpocalypse" for Dodge all-wheel drive vehicles uses Herrmann's main title theme for Cape Fear.
 "Gimme Some More" by Busta Rhymes is based on a sample from Herrmann's score from Psycho.
 The prologue to Lady Gaga's 2011 video for the song Born This Way features Herrmann's Vertigo prelude.
 The 2011 FX series American Horror Story used cues from Twisted Nerve, Psycho, and Vertigo for episode scores.
 The 2011 film The Artist used a soundtrack recording of the love theme from Vertigo. Film actress Kim Novak later voiced her concern about the use of the music, saying that her work "had been violated by The Artist".
 Paul Schackman portrayed Herrmann in the 2012 biopic Hitchcock.
 "The Whistle Song" from Twisted Nerve was used as an opening theme for the Quentin Tarantino film Kill Bill: Volume 1.
 Herrmann's scores from many Hitchcock films are prominently featured in the New York City immersive theatrical production Sleep No More; particular standouts include the prelude from The Man Who Knew Too Much as audience members wind through the dark portal-like maze at the start of the experience, leading them back in time to the 1930s; moments from Psycho being used to underscore the Macbeth elements of the story; and the characters' hour-long loops restarting to the opening suite from Vertigo.
 Benny & Hitch - "a brand new radio drama – with live orchestral music – about the extraordinary and explosive relationship between director Alfred Hitchcock and composer Bernard Herrmann." Performed as part of the BBC Concert Orchestra series. https://www.bbc.co.uk/events/e9qrn3 The play has been written by Andrew McCaldon. It was performed/recorded live on Sunday October 16th 2022 at the Alexandra Palace Theatre in London with BBC Concert Orchestra conducted by Ben Palmer. Acting as Hitchcock and Herrmann respectively, Toby Jones (who also portrayed Hitchcock in the BBC/HBO co-production The Girl (2012)) and Tim McInnerny. Also featuring Joanna Munro as Alma Hitchcock, Tara Ward as Lucy Anderson (and Tippi Hedren) and Jonathan Forbes as Lew Wasserman (and briefly as Paul Newman). Broadcast on BBC Radio 3 on December 25, 2022, at 7.30pm. Now available to stream on BBC Sounds https://www.bbc.co.uk/sounds/play/m001g9pz

Film scores

Television scores
Herrmann's work for television includes scores for such westerns as Cimarron Strip, Gunsmoke, Rawhide, Have Gun – Will Travel, as well as the 1968 suspense TV movie Companions in Nightmare.

For The Twilight Zone:
 Opening and closing themes (used only during the 1959–1960 season)
 Where Is Everybody? (first aired October 2, 1959)
 Walking Distance (first aired October 30, 1959)
 The Lonely (first aired November 13, 1959)
 Eye of the Beholder (first aired November 11, 1960)
 Little Girl Lost (first aired March 16, 1962)
 Living Doll (first aired November 1, 1963)

For the Alfred Hitchcock Hour:
 A Home Away from Home (first aired September 27, 1963)
 Terror at Northfield (first aired October 11, 1963
 You'll Be the Death of Me (first aired October 18, 1963)
 Nothing Ever Happens in Linvale (first aired November 8, 1963)
 The Jar (first aired February 14, 1964)
 Behind the Locked Door (first aired March 27, 1964
 Body in the Barn (first aired July 3, 1964)
 Change of Address (first aired October 12, 1964)
 Water's Edge (first aired October 19, 1964)
 The Life Work of Juan Diaz (first aired October 26, 1964)
 The McGregor Affair (first aired November 23, 1964)
 Misadventure (first aired December 7, 1964)
 Consider Her Ways (first aired December 28, 1964)
 Where the Woodbine Twineth (first aired January 11, 1965)
 An Unlocked Window (first aired February 15, 1965)
 Wally the Beard (first aired March 1, 1965)
 Death Scene (first aired March 8, 1965)

Radio scores

Melodrams
These works are for narrator and full orchestra, intended to be broadcast over the radio (since a human voice would not be able to be heard over the full volume of an orchestra). In a 1938 broadcast of the Columbia Workshop, Herrmann distinguished "melodrama" from "melodram" and explained that these works are not part of the former, but the latter. The 1935 works were composed before June 1935.
 La Belle Dame Sans Merci (September 1934)
 The City of Brass (December 1934)
 Annabel Lee (1934–1935)
 Poem Cycle (1935):
 The Willow Leaf
 Weep No More, Sad Fountains
 Something Tells
 A Shropshire Lad (1935)
 Cynara (June 1935)

Incidental music
See also Columbia Workshop for programs in which Herrmann participated but did not write original music.
 Palmolive Beauty Box (c. 1935) (2 existing cues)
 Dauber (October 1936)
 Rhythm of the Jute Mill (December 1936)
 The Gods of the Mountain (1936)
 A Christmas Carol (1954, a CBS-TV special, after Dickens)
 A Child Is Born (1955, a TV special hosted by Ronald Reagan with singers Nadine Conner and Theodor Uppman)
 Brave New World (1956)

Stage works
 Wuthering Heights: Opera (1951)
 The King of Schnorrers (1968) Musical comedy

Concert works
 The Forest, tone poem for large orchestra (1929)
 November Dusk, tone poem for large orchestra (1929)
 Tempest and Storm: Furies Shrieking!, for piano (1929)
 The Dancing Faun and The Bells, two songs for medium voice and small Chamber orchestra (1929)
 Requiescat, violin and piano (1929)
 Twilight, violin and piano (1929)
 March Militaire (1932), ballet music for Americana Revue (1932)
 Aria for Flute and Harp (1932)
 Variations on "Deep River" and "Water Boy" (1933)
 Prelude to Anathema, for fifteen instruments (1933)
 Silent Noon, for fourteen instruments (1933)
 The Body Beautiful (1935), music from the Broadway play
 Nocturne and Scherzo (1935)
 Sinfonietta for Strings (1935)
 Currier and Ives, suite (1935)
 Violin Concerto, unfinished (1937)
 Moby Dick, cantata (1937)
 Johnny Appleseed, unfinished cantata (1940)
 Symphony No. 1 (1941)
 The Fantasticks (1942)
 The Devil and Daniel Webster, suite (1942)
 For the Fallen (1943)
 Welles Raises Kane (1943)
 Echoes, string quartet (1965)
 Souvenirs de Voyage (1967)

See also

 Columbia Workshop, a radio series for which Herrmann was music director and composed or arranged many episodes
 High Anxiety, a comedy spoof that parodies many Hitchcock devices. including Herrmann's music
 Hitchcock & Herrmann, a stage play about the relationship between Herrmann and Alfred Hitchcock

References

Notes

Citations

Sources

Further reading
 
 
 
 Radigales, Jaume: 'Wagner's Heritage in Cinema: The Bernard Herrmann Case' In:

External links

 Bernard Herrmann Society
 
 The Bernard Herrmann Estate
 
 Obituary in Gramophone magazine
 
 Bernard Herrmann at Soundtrackguide.net
 
 The Bastard Child of Puccini in Film Score Monthly
 Bernard Herrmann: The Early Years in Soundtrack magazine
 Bernard Herrmann papers at University of California, Santa Barbara Library.
 Bernard Herrmann: A Celebration of his Life and Music 1988 radio documentary

Jewish American film score composers
Best Original Music BAFTA Award winners
Best Original Music Score Academy Award winners
American male classical composers
American classical composers
American film score composers
American male film score composers
American people of Russian-Jewish descent
20th-century classical composers
Jewish American classical composers
American opera composers
Male opera composers
1911 births
1975 deaths
Juilliard School alumni
Musicians from New York City
New York University alumni
Burials at Beth David Cemetery
String quartet composers
DeWitt Clinton High School alumni
20th-century American composers
Classical musicians from New York (state)
20th-century American male musicians
Varèse Sarabande Records artists
CBS people
20th-century American Jews
Composers from New York City